Meir Cohen may refer to:

Meir Cohen (politician) (born 1955), Israeli legislator, member of the Knesset
Meir Cohen (footballer) (born 1972), Israeli association football goalkeeper
Meir Cohen-Avidov (1926–2015), Israeli legislator, member of the Knesset
Mickey Cohen (given name Meyer) (1913–1976), Jewish-American gangster